A saying is any concisely written or spoken expression that is especially memorable because of its meaning or style. Sayings are categorized as follows:

 Aphorism: a general, observational truth; "a pithy expression of wisdom or truth".
 Adage, proverb, or saw: a widely known or popular aphorism that has gained credibility by long use or tradition.
 Apothegm: "an edgy, more cynical aphorism; such as, 'Men are generally more careful of the breed of their horses and dogs than of their children.'"
 Axiom: a proposition that commends itself to general acceptance; a well-established or universally conceded principle; a maxim, rule, or law.
 Cliché or bromide: an unoriginal and overused saying.
 Platitude: a cliché that is  unsuccessfully presented as though it were meaningful, original, or effective.
 Epigram: a clever and often poetic written saying that comments on a specific person, idea, or thing; it especially denominates such a saying that is conspicuously put at the beginning of a text.
 Epitaph: a saying in honor of a decedent, often engraved on a headstone or plaque.
 Epithet: a descriptive word or saying already widely associated with a specific person, idea, or thing.
 Idiom, idiomatic phrase or, phraseme: a saying that has only a non-literal interpretation; "an expression whose meaning can't be derived simply by hearing it, such as 'kick the bucket.'"
 Four-character idiom:
 Chengyu: Chinese four-character idioms
 Sajaseong-eo: Korean form of four-character idioms
 Yojijukugo: Japanese form of four-character idioms
 Mantra: a religious, mystical, or other spiritual saying that is repeated, for example, in meditation.
 Brocard
 Gnome
 Legal maxim
 Motto: a saying used frequently by a person or group to summarize its  general mission.
Slogan: a motto with the goal of persuading.
 Quip: a clever or humorous saying based on an observation.
 Witticism: a saying that is clever and usually humorous and that is notable for its form or style just as much as, or more than, its meaning.

References

External links

 

Phrases